Virididentex acromegalus (common name: bulldog dentex) is a species of carnivorous marine fish of the family Sparidae. It is the only species of the genus Virididentex. It is endemic to Cape Verde, where it occurs between 40 and 150 metres depth.

This fish lives in rocky bottoms, and grows to an average length of 30 cm, maximum 52 cm.

References

Further reading

 Eschmeyer, William N., ed. 1998. Catalog of Fishes. Special Publication of the Center for Biodiversity Research and Information, no. 1, vol. 1–3. California Academy of Sciences. San Francisco, California, USA. 2905. .
 Fenner, Robert M. The Conscientious Marine Aquarist. Neptune City, New Jersey, USA: T.F.H. Publications, 2001.
 Helfman, G., B. Collette and D. Facey: The diversity of fishes. Blackwell Science, Malden, Massachusetts, USA, 1997.
 Hoese, D.F. 1986. A M.M. Smith and P.C. Heemstra (eds.) Smiths' sea fishes. Springer-Verlag, Berlin, Germany
 Maugé, L.A. 1986. A J. Daget, J.-P. Gosse and D.F.E. Thys van den Audenaerde (eds.) Check-list of the freshwater fishes of Africa (CLOFFA). ISNB, Brussels; MRAC, Tervuren, Flanders; and ORSTOM, Paris, France, Vol. 2.
 Moyle, P. and J. Cech.: Fishes: An Introduction to Ichthyology, 4th ed., Upper Saddle River, New Jersey, USA: Prentice-Hall. 2000.
 Nelson, J.: Fishes of the World, 3rd ed.. New York, USA: John Wiley and Sons., 1994
 Wheeler, A.: The World Encyclopedia of Fishes, 2nd ed., London: Macdonald., 1985

Sparidae
Fish of West Africa
Endemic vertebrates of Cape Verde
Fish described in 1911